Anh Sơn may refer to several places in Vietnam:

Anh Sơn District, a rural district of Nghệ An Province
Anh Sơn (township), a township and capital of Anh Sơn District
, a rural commune of Nghi Sơn town